Magnus Norman (born 30 May 1976) is a Swedish tennis coach and former professional player. He has been ranked by the Association of Tennis Professionals (ATP) as high as world No. 2, in June 2000. His career highlights include reaching a major final at the French Open in 2000 (lost to Gustavo Kuerten), and winning an Masters title at the 2000 Rome Masters (defeated Kuerten in the final).

Norman owns the Good to Great Tennis Academy. Among its students are Stan Wawrinka, Gaël Monfils, and Grigor Dimitrov. He also plays bandy, a sport he played in his youth before deciding to concentrate on tennis.

Tennis career
Norman turned professional in 1995 when he was 19. His career was cut short when injuries struck during his peak in late 2000, after he reached semifinals of the Australian Open and the final of the French Open, as well as a Masters title in Rome and several other titles earlier during the season. He was on the verge of becoming world No. 1. His last match was played in September 2003 when he retired in the third round against Jiří Novák after just 3 games. He retired from tennis due to major hip and knee injuries in 2004 when he was only 27 and competed for just over 8 years on the ATP Tour.

Juniors
As a junior Norman posted a singles win–loss record of 46–24.

Professional playing career

1995

1996

1997 
In June, Norman made his first impact on the tour by reaching the quarterfinals of French Open. His most notable match of the tournament was his third round match against world No. 1 Pete Sampras, when Norman pulled off upset by defeating the heavily favored American in four sets. He then upset former semifinalist and Olympic gold medalist Marc Rosset in 4 sets. Eventually Norman would lose to Belgian qualifier Filip Dewulf in four sets. As a result of this run, Norman cracked the Top 50 for the first time in his career. A month later at Wimbledon, he astonished the tennis world even more when he defeated 2nd seed, 2-time finalist and 2-time semifinalist Goran Ivanišević in the second round in a titanic battle, 14–12 in the fifth set. A week later, Norman captured his first title on the ATP Tour by winning Swedish Open in Båstad by defeating Spaniard Juan Antonio Marín in straight sets. In October he reached another final in Ostrava, but has to retire after losing the first set in less than half an hour. He finished the year as world No. 22.

1998 
Norman underwent corrective surgery for a heart valve condition in 1998 because of an irregular heartbeat. During the year he had a key role in Sweden's Davis Cup victory, which remained Sweden's last title to this date.

1999

2000 
Norman experienced tremendous success during the first half of the year: he reached the semifinals of the Australian Open, won the Rome Masters, beating Gustavo Kuerten of Brazil in 4 sets, and was the runner-up at the French Open, where he defeated Thierry Guardiola, Fabrice Santoro, Sargis Sargsian, Andrei Medvedev, Marat Safin and Franco Squillari before Kuerten took revenge in the final, after Norman saved 10 championship points. Had he won the match he would have become the first Swede since his idol Stefan Edberg to ascend to the world No. 1 position. The loss also snapped his streak of winning 8 consecutive finals dating to 1998.

His decline from persistent major injuries in the hips and knees began late that year at the Sydney Olympics, when he lost in the third round to Frenchman Arnaud Di Pasquale in straight sets (Di Pasquale went on to win the bronze medal).

In 1999 and 2000, Norman won 10 titles in total, which was more than anyone else on the ATP Tour during that period.

2001

2002

2003

2004

After retirement 
Since retiring as a player with a bittersweet career at such a young age, Norman decided to spend time away from tennis; he cursed the sport: "I didn't watch any tennis, didn't pick up a racquet." In 2005 he served as the Board of the Swedish Tennis Federation, and also worked with a Swedish Junior Team for a while. Between 2006 and 2008, he studied marketing and economics at IHM Business school in Stockholm. At the same time he also worked at Catella Fund Management.

Norman gradually realized that he still had a lot to give back to tennis, saying that he thought it was really good for him to be away from tennis, have other friends and develop outside the tennis world, but he wanted to hang out in locker rooms; he missed tennis. And because of his tragic career, Norman said he felt he still had something to prove to himself with respect to tennis, that he "left something on the table" in his career. With this motivation, he decided to pick up tennis once more. He started working with former doubles partner Thomas Johansson in the latter stages of Johansson's career during his vacation time in 2008, at the same time serving as coach of the Swedish Olympic Tennis team. He guided the Swedish team to silver medals in men's doubles (Johansson and Simon Aspelin).

Coaching 
Norman has gradually built himself a reputation as one of the greatest and most respected tennis coaches around the world. After Johansson, Norman left Catella altogether to begin coaching fellow Swedish Robin Söderling who under his wing reached consecutive Grand Slam finals at the French Open in 2009 and 2010, won the Paris Masters in 2010, qualified for the ATP World Tour Finals both years and reached a career-high world No. 4 before they parted by the end of 2010 season as Norman decided that he wanted to spend more time with his young family and Söderling needed a full-time coach. Söderling took Norman's recommendation for the coach and was on the track of another good season before injuries and mononucleosis ended his career, 7 months after Norman's departure when he was still ranked No. 5 in the world and having just won a title with 2 consecutive top 10 wins in the semifinal and finals with the loss of just 5 games in total during the process.

Norman was then wanted by a few prominent players on tour as their coach; Norman declined the requests as he still needs more time with his family and he had just started a new tennis academy that needed careful management, called the Good to Great Tennis Academy in 2011 with fellow former Swedish tennis players Mikael Tillström and Nicklas Kulti.

He eventually decided to coach Stan Wawrinka starting from the 2013 season, who has since won three Grand Slams: the 2014 Australian Open, 2015 French Open, and the 2016 US Open; an ATP World Tour Masters 1000 title at the 2014 Monte-Carlo Masters; and Switzerland's maiden Davis Cup title in 2014, while also qualifying for the Tour Finals every year since their partnership and ending significant losing streaks against Rafael Nadal and Novak Djokovic in the process (as well as earning previously rare wins over compatriot Roger Federer) and reached world No. 3. As a recognition of his achievements Norman won the inaugural ATP Coach of the Year award in 2016.

Playing style
Magnus Norman was known as one of the most powerful and fittest athletes on tour. On top of that, he is known for his work ethic and his perfectionism on court. During earlier stages of career he played serve and volley style tennis, influenced by his idol Stefan Edberg, but later started employing aggressive baseline play. Norman possessed a very dangerous forehand and he would often flatten his groundstrokes whenever he had a chance and go for winner. He could also generate great pace on his flat two-handed backhand. Norman also utilized drop shots and attacked the net on occasion.

He also has one of the strongest and toughest mental game of all time. One of the best displays of it was 2000 French Open final, when Norman saved 10 championship points before falling to Gustavo Kuerten in the tiebreak of the fourth set.

Personal life
Norman began playing tennis at the age of 8 when his grandmother gave him a racquet for his birthday. He is the oldest child of his father, Leif (who played bandy in the Swedish second division), and his mother, Leena (who was a swimmer on Swedish national team). He has a younger brother, Marcus, who also plays bandy and is the Secretary General of the Swedish Bandy Association.

He briefly dated Swiss tennis player Martina Hingis.

Significant finals

Grand Slam finals

Singles: 1 (1 runner-up)

Masters Series finals

Singles: 1 (1 title)

Career finals

Singles: 18 (12 titles, 6 runner-ups)

Doubles: 1 (1 runner-up)

Performance timeline

Singles 

1Held in Stockholm till 1994, Stuttgart Masters from 1995 till 2001, Madrid Masters from 2002 to 2008.

Top 10 wins

References

External links
 
 
 

1976 births
Living people
People from Filipstad
Olympic tennis players of Sweden
People from Monte Carlo
Swedish expatriates in Monaco
Swedish male tennis players
Swedish bandy players
Tennis players at the 2000 Summer Olympics
Swedish tennis coaches
Sportspeople from Värmland County